Amar Manikya was the Maharaja of Tripura from 1577 to 1586.

Early life
Born Amardeva, he was a son of Maharaja Deva Manikya, but was only a prince as another family had taken over the throne.

General Ranagan Narayan, the de facto ruler of Twipra, was jealous of the popularity enjoyed by Amar. Narayan invited him to a dinner where he planned to have Amar killed. However, Amar escaped and rallied his supporters to capture Narayan and have his head cut off. When Joy Manikya I, the puppet Maharaja, demanded an explanation for Narayan's death, Amar dispatched his troops against Joy, who attempted to flee before being overtaken and also beheaded. Joy's death is believed to have occurred in 1577, having reigned about 4 years. Amaradeva subsequently took power under the name Amar Manikya, thus restoring the throne to the original ruling dynasty.

Reign
Amar Manikya was digging a tank, now known as Amar Sagar, in his capital at Udaipur for religious reasons. He demanded various chieftains to supply labour for this task and pay tribute to Twipra. The Rajmala chronicles highlights all the donations provided by the Baro-Bhuiyans, numbering at least over 500 labourers. The zamindar of Taraf, Syed Musa, was the only ruler to refuse to accept such subordination as he viewed Taraf to be an independent principality. This angered Amar Manikya and started the Battle of Jilkua in Chunarughat in 1581, which was most likely the first military expedition in Amar's reign. Musa called upon Fateh Khan, a Baro-Bhuyan zamindar of Sylhet, who came to his aid. Isa Khan was appointed as Manikya's naval commander. The Tripuris were victorious and Syed Musa and his son Syed Adam were taken as prisoners. Syed Musa was imprisoned in Udaipur, but Adam was eventually set free. The Twipra army then proceeded to Gudhrail, via Dinarpur and the Surma River, where they defeated Fateh Khan with the help of their elephants. Khan was captured and transported to Udaipur via Dulali and Ita. He was treated well and later released. Amar Manikya was very proud of the successful conquest of Taraf and even minted a coin referring to himself as the Conqueror of Sylhet. This coin was in the possession of Bir Bikram Kishore Debbarman in the 20th century.

Following the conquest of Noakhali and Chittagong by the Arakanese king Min Phalaung, a large contingent was sent by Amar Manikya into the occupied regions to drive out the invaders. The army landed and captured six enemy camps successively before halting at Ramu. The Arakanese, following a failed retaliatory assault, blockaded the troops, resulting in the latter's supplies soon dwindling. Additionally, the Portuguese soldiers who formed part of the Tripura army were enticed to desert, turning their camps over to the enemy. This forced the Tripuri to begin retreating back to Chittagong, though at the Karnaphuli River, they were attacked and defeated by the Arakanese, resulting in heavy casualties. However, upon reaching Chittagong, the army reorganised and launched a counter-assault, capturing seven of the enemy fortresses and forcing their retreat.

Death and legacy
After a brief hiatus, a second invasion of Chittagong was launched by Min Phalaung. The Tripura army were routed in the ensuing conflict, with Amar's son Jujhar Singh being killed and his other son Rajdhar suffering a serious bullet wound. The Arakanese then invaded Tripura itself, penetrating all the way to Udaipur and having it sacked and plundered. As a result of this humiliation, Amar Manikya committed suicide, with his wife later performing Sati in his funeral pyre. Amar was succeeded by his son Rajdhar Manikya I.

References

Bibliography

Kings of Tripura
History of Tripura
1586 deaths
16th-century suicides